The 2013 Campeonato Maranhense de Futebol was the 96th edition of the Maranhão's top professional football league. The competition began on February 17, and ended on June 12. Maranhão Atlético Clube won the championship for the 14th time, while São José and Americano were relegated.

Format
In the first stage, there are two rounds. Each round is a round-robin. The four best teams in each round advances to a playoff, so the winner of the round can be determined.

In the final stage, each round winner plays in the final. If the same team wins both rounds, that team is the champion.

Qualifications
The champion qualifies to the 2014 Copa do Brasil.

Participating teams

First round

Standings

Results

Playoffs

Semifinals

First leg

Second leg

Finals

Sociedade Imperatriz de Desportos won the first round and qualifies to the Final stage.

Second round

Standings

Results

Playoffs

Semifinals

First leg

Second leg

Finals

Maranhão Atlético Clube won the second round and qualifies to the Final stage.

Final stage

Maranhão won the 2013 Campeonato Brasiliense.

Final standings

References

Maranhense